In Praise of Older Women may refer to:

 In Praise of Older Women (book), first published in 1966
 In Praise of Older Women (1978 film)
 In Praise of Older Women (1997 film)
 In Praise of Older Women and Other Crimes -  1985 album by Kid Creole and the Coconuts